The Suzuki Baleno nameplate has been used by the Japanese manufacturer Suzuki to denote several different subcompact cars since 1996.

 From 1996 to 2002, the Suzuki Baleno that was sold in Europe and Asia-Pacific was a rebadged Suzuki Cultus Crescent. It was also produced and sold in India as the Maruti Suzuki Baleno until 2007.
 After the introduction of the Suzuki Aerio in 2001, the Baleno nameplate was discontinued in Europe and Asia Pacific, and remained in use only in Indonesia. This Baleno was a rebadged Suzuki Aerio sedan, marketed as the Suzuki Baleno Next-G, sold from 2003 to 2007.
 From 2008 to 2010, the Indonesian market received a rebadged Suzuki SX4 sedan, marketed as the Suzuki Neo Baleno.
 Suzuki Baleno – A five-door hatchback automobile introduced in 2015.

References

Baleno